This is a list of video games based on the wrestling sport of sumo.

Published exclusively in Japan
These games were published exclusively in Japan.

 Shusse Ōzumō - Arcade - 1984
 Tsuppari Ōzumō - Family Computer, Virtual Console - 1987
 Terao no Dosukoi Ōzumō - Family Computer - 1989
 Chiyonofuji no Ōichō - Family Computer - 1990
 SD Battle Ōzumō: Heisei Hero Basho - Family Computer - 1990
 Ōzumō Spirit - Super Famicom - 1992
 Super Ōzumō: Netsusen Daiichiban - Super Famicom - 1992
 Masakari Densetsu: Kintarou Action-Hen (Sumo-based game) - Game Boy - 1992
 Tsuppari Ōzumō: Heisei Han - PC Engine - 1993
 Tsuppari Ōzumō: Risshin Shusse Hen - Super Famicom - 1993
 Waka Taka Ōzumō: Brothers Dream Match - Super Famicom - 1993
 Aah! Harimanada - Game Gear, Game Boy, Sega Genesis - 1993
 Onita Atsushi FMW (features Sumo elements) - Super Famicom - 1993
 Yokozuna Monogatari - Super Famicom - 1994
 Deae Tonosama Appare Ichiban (features Sumo scenes) - Super Famicom - 1995
 64 Ōzumō - Nintendo 64 - 1997
 64 Ōzumō 2 - Nintendo 64 - 1999
 Nippon Sumō Kyōkai Kōnin: Nippon Ōzumō - PlayStation - 2000
 Simple 1500 Series Vol. 58: The Sumo - PlayStation - 2001
Nippon Ōzumō Kakutōhen - PlayStation 2 - 2001
Nihon Sumō Kyōkai Kōnin: Nihon Ōzumō Gekitō Honbashohen - PlayStation 2 - 2002
Domo-kun no Fushigi Terebi - Game Boy Advance - 2002

Published internationally
Sumo Wrestlers - Commodore 64 - 1985 (published exclusively in North America and Europe)
Sumo Fighter: Tōkaidō Basho - Game Boy - JP 1991 (NA 1993)
Super Duper Sumos - Game Boy Advance (NA October 26, 2003)
Sumo Slam - non-commercial flash PC game by Orange Fox Games - 2007
Spaceman Sumo - BlackBerry - 2009
Tsuppari Ōzumō Wii Heya (JP) / Eat! Fat! Fight! (NA) - Wii - 2009
Sumotori Dreams - PC - 2007
The Sumou - iPhone/iPod - 2011 (NA)
Sumoscience - iPhone/iPod - 2019
SumoscienceAR - iPhone/iPod - 2020

See also
List of fighting games
List of professional wrestling video games

External links
2D Sumo Wrestling Games at Hardcore Gaming 101
Sumo wrestling games at MobyGames

Video games
Video games
Video game lists by genre